Tetropium cinnamopterum is a species of beetle in the family Cerambycidae. It was described by William Kirby in 1837.

References

Spondylidinae
Beetles described in 1837
Taxa named by William Kirby (entomologist)